Susann Rüthrich (born 21 July 1977) is a German politician of the Social Democratic Party (SPD) who has been serving as a member of the Bundestag from the state of Saxony since 2013.

Political career 
Rüthrich became a member of the Bundestag in the 2013 German federal election. In parliament, she is a member of the Committee on Families, Senior Citizens, Women and Youth.

She contested the Meißen constituency in 2009, 2013 and 2017.

Other activities  
 Federal Agency for Civic Education (BPB), Alternate Member of the Board of Trustees (2018–2021)
 Magnus Hirschfeld Foundation, Member of the Board of Trustees

References

External links 

  
 Bundestag biography 

1977 births
Living people
Members of the Bundestag for Saxony
Female members of the Bundestag
21st-century German women politicians
Members of the Bundestag 2017–2021
Members of the Bundestag 2013–2017
Members of the Bundestag for the Social Democratic Party of Germany